Society for Experimental Mechanics (SEM) is a professional organization for engineers and scientists studying the design and implementation of experiments to characterize materials, structures, and systems. Formed in 1943 as the Society for Experimental Stress Analysis (SESA), early work focused on methods such as photoelasticity and strain gages.  Society historical records refer to the society as SESA through the 1984 Fall SESA meeting in Milwaukee, WI and start referring the society as SEM with the 1985 Spring SEM meeting in Las Vegas, NV.  The society has expanded to include topics including modal analysis, digital image correlation, Split Hopkinson pressure bar, Residual stress, and biomaterials.

Technical Divisions

The society comprises seventeen technical divisions that program sessions at either the SEM Annual Conference or IMAC Conference, and develop content for publications:

 Applied Photoelasticity
 Biological Systems and Materials
 Dynamics of Civil Structures
 Composite, Hybrid & Multifunctional Materials
 Dynamic Behavior of Materials
 Fracture and Fatigue
 Inverse Problem Methodologies
 MEMS and Nanotechnology
 Modal Analysis
 Model Validation & Uncertainty Quantification
 Optical Methods
 Residual Stress
 Technical Committee on Strain Gages
 Thermomechanics and Infrared Imaging
 Time Dependent Materials
 Sensors and Instrumentation
 The Western Regional Strain Gage Committee

Publications

SEM publishes proceedings volume from the SEM Annual Conference and IMAC Conference with its publishing partner Springer Science+Business Media.
SEM-published journals include:

 Experimental Mechanics, which prints 9 issues annual of peer-reviewed manuscripts on advances in experimental mechanics.
 Journal of Dynamic Behavior of Materials, which prints peer-reviewed manuscripts on materials in high strain-rate and extreme conditions.
 Experimental Techniques, which is a bimonthly publication on the development and application of experimental mechanics techniques.

See also
 Fellows of the Society for Experimental Mechanics

References

External links
 Society for Experimental Mechanics Home Page

Engineering societies based in the United States